Sir James Hann  (18 January 1933 – 14 February 2004) was a British businessman and former chairman of Scottish Nuclear.

Early life
He was born in Southampton. He had a brother and sister. He would later study at the Institut pour l'Etude des Methodes de Direction de l'Entreprise (IMEDE, now IMD) in Lausanne. From 1952-54 he did his National Service in the Royal Artillery.

Career

Scottish Nuclear
He became Chairman of Scottish Nuclear.  It was planned to sell off the entire electricity industry, but the stock market would not buy the nuclear industry components as they contained too much risk and long-term cost. British Energy was actually privatised in 1996, having been formed in 1995.

Scottish Nuclear consisted of Hunterston B in North Ayrshire, and Torness in East Lothian; the two AGR power stations had been run by the South of Scotland Electricity Board before privatisation. Hunterston A had been shut down the day before privatisation (31 March 1990). Scottish Nuclear supplied 40% of Scottish electricity. As a Chairman, his salary was £39,000. He joined the European Nuclear Society.

Personal life
He married Jill Howe in 1957 in Southampton. His wife was a nursing sister when he went into hospital. They had a son (born 1959) and a daughter (born 1961). He lived in Wrington in North Somerset. When Chairman of Scottish Nuclear, he lived in Dunbartonshire, and had earlier lived in Banchory. He was appointed CBE in the 1977 Silver Jubilee and Birthday Honours. He was knighted in the 1996 Birthday Honours. His wife died in 1999.

See also
 Energy policy of the United Kingdom
 Nuclear power in the United Kingdom

References

External links
 Telegraph obituary February 2004
 Scotsman obituary

1933 births
2004 deaths
Military personnel from Southampton
20th-century British Army personnel
British chief executives in the energy industry
Businesspeople awarded knighthoods
Businesspeople in nuclear power
Commanders of the Order of the British Empire
Knights Bachelor
Nuclear power in Scotland
Businesspeople from Southampton
People from Wrington
Royal Artillery personnel